Morgan Stanley Wealth Management is an American multinational financial services corporation specializing in retail brokerage. It is the wealth & asset management division of Morgan Stanley.
On January 13, 2009, Morgan Stanley and Citigroup announced that Citigroup would sell 51% of Smith Barney to Morgan Stanley, creating Morgan Stanley Smith Barney, which was formerly a division of Citi Global Wealth Management. The combined brokerage house has 17,646 financial advisors and manages $2 trillion in client assets. Clients range from individual investors to small- and mid-sized businesses, as well as large corporations, non-profit organizations and family foundations.

On September 25, 2012, Morgan Stanley announced that its U.S. wealth management business was renamed "Morgan Stanley Wealth Management". The broker-dealer designation for Morgan Stanley Wealth Management will remain "Morgan Stanley Smith Barney LLC".

History

Smith Barney & Co. was formed in 1938 through the merger of Charles D. Barney & Co. and Edward B. Smith & Co.  Charles D. Barney & Co., a New York and Philadelphia based firm, was founded by Charles D. Barney in 1873 following the failure of its predecessor Jay Cooke & Company.  Edward B. Smith & Co., founded in 1892 became a significant player in securities underwriting in 1934 when the firm absorbed the professionals from the securities business of Guaranty Trust Company, following the passage of the Glass Steagall Act.

In 1975, Smith Barney merged with Harris, Upham & Co. to form Smith Barney, Harris Upham & Co., which, in 1977, was placed under SBHU Holdings, a holding company. In 1982, SBHU Holdings was renamed Smith Barney Inc.  During the 1980s, the company was known for its television commercials featuring actor John Houseman, with the catchphrase, "They make money the old-fashioned way. They earn it." After Houseman stepped down, the campaign continued with various actors, such as Leo McKern, Joel Higgins and George C. Scott.

In the late 1980s, the retail brokerage firm Smith Barney was owned by Sanford I. Weill's Primerica Corporation. Commercial Credit purchased Primerica in 1988, for $1.5 billion ($ today). In 1992, they paid $722 million ($ today) to buy a 27% share of Travelers Insurance and in 1993 acquired Shearson (which included the legacy business of E.F. Hutton) from American Express.  By the end of 1993, the merged company was known as Travelers Group Inc. although the brokerage business continued to operate under the Smith Barney brand.

In 1993, Weill bought stockbroker Shearson back from American Express for $1 billion ($ today), and merged it into Smith Barney. (Weill had been in charge of Shearson Loeb Rhoades and sold it to American Express in 1981.) 
Weill offered Joe Plumeri the presidency of Smith Barney, and he became the President of the merged company that year. He only lasted a year, as he experienced conflicts with existing Smith Barney managers.

In September 1997, Travelers acquired Salomon Inc. (parent company of Salomon Brothers Inc.), for over $9 billion ($ today) in stock, and merged it with its own investment arm to create Salomon Smith Barney. In April 1998 Travelers Group announced an agreement to undertake a $76 billion ($ today) merger between Travelers and Citicorp, creating Citigroup, which at the time of the merger was the largest single financial services company in the world. 

At the time of the September 11, 2001, attacks, it was the largest tenant in 7 World Trade Center, occupying 1,202,900 sq ft (111,750 m2) (64 percent of the building) which included floors 28–45.

Sale to Morgan Stanley
During the major financial crisis beginning in late 2008, Citigroup suffered large losses in its retained collateralized debt obligation exposure (loans that Citi underwrote but was not able to sell), and had to be rescued by the U.S. federal government. They decided to sell or close "non-core" businesses in order to raise money. On January 13, 2009, Morgan Stanley and Citigroup announced the merger of Smith Barney with Morgan Stanley's Global Wealth Management Group, with Morgan Stanley paying $2.7 billion cash upfront to Citigroup for a 51% stake in the joint venture. The joint venture operates as Morgan Stanley Smith Barney.
Morgan Stanley itself was in a financially cash-strapped position like Citigroup during that time, but they were helped by the $9 billion that  Mitsubishi UFJ Financial Group had paid in 2008 for a 21% stake in Morgan Stanley.

On June 1, 2009, Morgan Stanley and Citigroup announced they closed early on the launch of their joint venture that combines Morgan Stanley's wealth management unit (including many former Dean Witter assets) with Citi's Smith Barney brokerage division. The new venture, called Morgan Stanley Smith Barney, was supposed to launch during the third quarter. The combined entity generates about $14 billion in net revenue, has 18,500 financial advisors, 1,000 locations worldwide and serves about 6.8 million households.

Citigroup disclosed on September 17, 2009, they would sell their remaining shares in the group to partner Morgan Stanley.

Acquisition history
The following is an illustration of the company's major mergers and acquisitions and historical predecessors (this is not a comprehensive list):

References

External links

Morgan Stanley Wealth Management website
Smith Barney

Investment management companies of the United States
Citigroup
Morgan Stanley
American corporate subsidiaries
Companies based in Manhattan
Multinational joint-venture companies
Investment companies based in New York City
Multinational companies based in New York City
Financial services companies established in 2009
2009 establishments in New York City
American companies established in 2009
2009 mergers and acquisitions